Senator Morales may refer to:

Howie Morales (born 1973), New Mexico State Senate
Luis Sánchez Morales (1867–1934), Senate of Puerto Rico
Martín Vargas Morales (born 1971), Senate of Puerto Rico